Dictatus papae is a compilation of 27 statements of authority claimed by the pope that was included in Pope Gregory VII's register under the year 1075.

Principles
The principles expressed in Dictatus Papae are mostly those expressed by the Gregorian Reform, which had been initiated by Gregory decades before he became pope. It does not mention key aspects of the reform movement such as the abolishing of the triple abuse of clerical marriage, lay investiture and simony. The axioms of the Dictatus advance the strongest case for papal supremacy and infallibility. The axiom "That it may be permitted to him to depose emperors" qualified the early medieval balance of power embodied in the letter Famuli vestrae pietatis of Pope Gelasius I to the Eastern Roman Emperor Anastasius (494), which outlined the separation and complementarity of spiritual and temporal powers - auctoritas (spiritual) and potestas or imperium (temporal), the former being ultimately superior to the latter - under which the West had been ruled since Merovingian times. "None of the conflicts of the years 1075 and following can be directly traced to opposition to it (though several of the claims made in it were also made by Gregory and his supporters during these conflicts)". Later medieval developments of the relationship between spiritual and secular power would come with Pope Boniface VIII, who famously formulated the image of the two swords in the papal bull Unam Sanctam (1302).

While most of the principles of the Dictatus Papae detail the powers of the papacy and infallibility of the Roman church,  principle 9 dictates that "All princes shall kiss the feet of the Pope alone," and principle 10 states that "His [the pope's] name alone shall be spoken in the churches."

Authorship
The title Dictatus Papae implies that the pope composed the piece himself. It does not mean a "papal dictate" or any kind of a manifesto; rather it means "papal dictation". It was not published, in the sense of being widely copied and made known outside the immediate circle of the papal curia.

Some historians believe that it was written or dictated by Gregory himself, and others that it had a different origin and was inserted in the register at a later date. In 1087 Deusdedit, a cardinal and ally of Gregory, published a collection of decretals, dedicated to Pope Victor III, that embodied the law of the Church – canon law – which he had compiled from many sources, both legitimate and false (see Pseudo-Isidore). The Dictatus Papae agrees so closely with this collection that some have argued the Dictatus must have been based on it.

List of Principles
   The Roman Church was founded solely by God.
   Only the Pope can with right be called "Universal".
   He alone can depose or reinstate bishops.
   All bishops are below his Legate in council, even if a lower grade, and he can pass sentence of deposition against them.
   The Pope may depose the absent.
   Among other things, we ought not to remain in the same house with those excommunicated by him.
   For him alone is it lawful, according to the needs of the time, to make new laws, to assemble together new congregations, to make an abbey of a canonry, and, on the other hand, to divide a rich bishopric and unite the poor ones.
   He alone may use the Imperial Insignia.
   All princes shall kiss the feet of the Pope alone.
   His name alone shall be spoken in the churches.
   His title is unique in the world.
   It may be permitted to him to depose emperors.
   It may be permitted to him to transfer bishops, if need be.
   He has the power to ordain the clerk of any parish he wishes.
   He who is ordained by the Pope may preside over another church, but may not hold a subordinate position. Such a person may not receive a higher clerical grade from any other bishop.
   No synod shall be called a "General Synod" without his order.
   No chapter and no book shall be considered canonical without his authority.
   A sentence passed by him may be retracted by no one. He alone may retract it.
   He himself may be judged by no one.
   No one shall dare to condemn any person who appeals to the Apostolic Chair.
   The more important cases of every church should be referred to the Apostolic See.
   The Roman Church has never erred. Nor will it err, to all eternity—Scripture being witness.
   The Roman Pontiff, if he has been canonically ordained, is undoubtedly made holy by the merits of St. Peter, St. Ennodius Bishop of Pavia bearing witness, and many holy fathers agreeing with him. As it is contained in the decrees of Pope St. Symmachus.
   By his command and consent, it may be lawful for subordinates to bring accusations.
   He may depose and reinstate bishops without assembling a Synod.
   He who is not at peace with the Roman Church shall not be considered "catholic".
   He may absolve subjects from their fealty to wicked men.

See also

 Apostasy
 Heresy
 Libertas ecclesiae

Notes

References

Das Register Gregors. VII, ed. E. Caspar (in series M.G.H. Epistolae Selectae ii, Berlin 1920-3), pp. 202–8: section translated by G.A. Loud

Catholic ecclesiology
Canon law history